Gamuda Berhad is an engineering, property and infrastructure company based in Malaysia. It is one of the largest Malaysian infrastructure companies and has undertaken various projects, both locally and overseas, like the construction of Klang Valley MRT lines, highways, airport runways, railways, tunnels, water treatment plants, dams, infrastructure concessions and the development of new townships.

Background 
The company was incorporated as a private limited company on 6 October 1976 in Ipoh, Perak  and was listed on the main a board of Bursa Malaysia on 10 August 1992. It was founded by Koon Yew Yin and Lin Yun Ling.

One of its major projects was the Stormwater Management and Road Tunnel (SMART Tunnel) project – a 50:50 joint venture collaboration with MMC Corporation Berhad. Completed in year 2007, this 9.7 km SMART tunnel primary function is to divert excess floodwater from Sungai Klang and Sungai Ampang to be stored in the storage pond. This dual-purpose tunnel also serves as an alternative route for the motorist to travel to and from the city centre.

In 2008, MMC-Gamuda was awarded the RM12.485 billion worth of Electrified Double Track Project (EDTP) from Ipoh to Padang Besar. This 329 km Project involves the realignment and construction of the electrified double railways that span across four northern states of Perak, Penang, Kedah and Perlis in Peninsular Malaysia. Works are progressing well at 97% overall completion stage and upon completion in November 2014, EDTP will serve as the backbone for the future commuters services in northern area which enable the residents to travel between urban and sub-urban area.

As the Government of Malaysia is transforming Malaysia to become a fully developed nation by year 2020, the railway is playing a pivotal role in the emergence of the public transportation system. Travelling through rail is one of the most efficient travelling methods in avoiding traffic and reduces fuel consumption. Hence, the Klang Valley Mass Rapid Transit (KVMRT) is made as an Entry Point Project of the Economic Transformation Programme (ETP) under the Greater Kuala Lumpur / Klang Valley National Key Economic Area (NKEA).

In January 2011, MMC-Gamuda received the letter of award that they were appointed as the Project Delivery Partner (PDP) for the KVMRT (Sungai Buloh – Kajang Line) (KVMRT, SBK Line). Being the PDP, MMC-Gamuda's role is to deliver the project within the target cost and completion dates, managing the elevated works package contractors, as well as dividing elevated works packages, evaluating tenders, recommending the best elevated works package contractors to MRT Corporation, the owner of the KVMRT project.

Besides, in March 2012, MMC Gamuda (T) Sdn Bhd was appointed as the turnkey contractor for the 9.5 km underground works for KVMRT, SBK Line worth RM8.28 billion. Seven underground stations will be constructed along the 9.5 km tunnel – KL Sentral, Pasar Seni, Merdeka, Bukit Bintang, Pasar Rakyat, Cochrane and Maluri. This underground works package inclusive of the design, construction and completion of tunnels, stations and associated structures between the Semantan Portal and Maluri Portal.

A total of 10 Tunnel Boring Machines (TBMs) have been purchased for the KVMRT, SBK Line tunnelling works. Out of the 10 TBMs, six of them are Variable Density TBMs (VD TBMs) which was co-designed and co-developed by MMC Gamuda in partnership with Herrenknecht AG, the world's largest tunnel boring manufacturer. The VD TBMs are specially designed to tunnel through the Kuala Lumpur's extreme karstic limestone geology. In contrast, the remaining four Earth Pressure Balance TBMs (EPB TBMs) are used to bore through the Kenny Hill formation. The built-in technology in the TBMs prevents the loosening and collapse of the tunnel face during boring, and minimises surface settlement above the tunnels which avoid land subsidence (a major cause of sinkholes). Besides, the TBMs are also designed to reduce water drawdown, which is a major contributory factor in sinkholes developing.

Overall the works for both elevated and underground sections of the SBK Line are advancing fast with progress on-track, and the project is expected to complete by the year 2017.

Besides the local projects they are developing, Gamuda has ventured internationally with various civil engineering construction, infrastructure and property development located in Taiwan, South East and Far East Asia, Indochina, Middle East and Vietnam.

On 28 July 2016, Gamuda announces that it had team up with Sarawak-based Naim Holdings Berhad via an associate company, Naim Gamuda (NAGA) JV Sdn Bhd. Their role is main contractor for Pantu Junction - Batang Skrang section in Sarawak in Pan Borneo Highway project in works package contract (WPC04 PJS).

On 1 July 2020 it was announced that Gamuda Bhd would be the project delivery partner (PDP) for the Penang Transport Master Plan (PTMP).

Infrastructure projects

Airports 
New Doha International Airport (NDIA), Qatar

Bridge 
Sitra Causeway Bridges, Bahrain

Expressway Network 
 Shah Alam Expressway
 Damansara–Puchong Expressway
 Sprint Expressway
 Stormwater Management and Road Tunnel (SMART Tunnel), Malaysia
Panagarh-Palsit and Durgapur Expressways, India
Dukhan Highway, Qatar
 Pan-Borneo Highway

Mass Rapid Transit 
Klang Valley Mass Rapid Transit (KVMRT), Malaysia
Sungai Buloh-Kajang Line (SBK Line)
Sungai Buloh-Serdang-Putrajaya Line (SSP Line)
Kaohsiung Metropolitan Mass Rapid Transit (KMRT), Taiwan

Railway 
Electrified Double Track Project (EDTP)(Ipoh-Padang Besar), Malaysia

Township Development (Gamuda Land) 
Kota Kemuning, Shah Alam – A township
Bandar Botanic, Klang
Valencia, Sungai Buloh
Horizon Hills, Johor – Located within the Iskandar Development Region
Jade Hills, Kajang
Gamuda Gardens, Rawang
Gamuda Cove, Kuala Langat
Gamuda Kemuning Twenty-five.7, Kuala Langat
Madge Mansion, Kuala Lumpur
The Robertson, Kuala Lumpur
Kelana Jaya Development, Petaling Jaya
Bukit Bantayan Residences, Kota Kinabalu, Sabah
661 Chapel ST, Melbourne
Gamuda City, Vietnam
Celadon City, Vietnam

Water Treatment and Supply and Sewage Treatment 
Sungai Selangor Water Supply Scheme Phase 1 (SSP1), Malaysia
Sungai Selangor Water Supply Scheme Phase 3 (SSP3), Malaysia
Yen So Sewage Treatment Plant, Vietnam

References

External links 
 Gamuda Group
 Reuters
Gamuda Real Viet Nam

Conglomerate companies of Malaysia
Construction and civil engineering companies of Malaysia
Construction and civil engineering companies established in 1976
Malaysian brands
Companies listed on Bursa Malaysia
Malaysian companies established in 1976